Lawrence 'Lol' Arthur Spence (14 January 1932 – 10 October 2017) was an English cricketer. He was a right-handed batsman who bowled leg break. He was born at Blaby, Leicestershire.

Spence made his first-class debut for Leicestershire against Warwickshire in the 1952 County Championship at Grace Road, and made eight further appearances in that season. The following season, he made ten first-class appearances, eight of them in the County Championship. His final first-class appearance for the county came in his only match in 1954 against Kent. He made a total of twenty first-class appearances for Leicestershire, scoring 326 runs at an average of 11.64, with a high score of 44. He died in 2017.

References

External links
Lawrence Spencer at ESPNcricinfo
Lawrence Spencer at CricketArchive

1932 births
2017 deaths
People from Blaby
Cricketers from Leicestershire
English cricketers
Leicestershire cricketers